Kutch Lacuna is a large intermittent lake on Titan.

It is located at 88.4°N and 217°W on Titan's surface and is 175km in length.  The lake is composed of liquid ethane and methane and was detected by the Cassini–Huygens space probe. Indications are that it is an Intermittent lake and so was named in 2013 after the Great Rann of Kutch, India-Pakistan.

References

Lakes of Titan (moon)